The 2024 United States House of Representatives elections in New Jersey will be held on November 5, 2024, to elect the twelve U.S. representatives from the State of New Jersey, one from all twelve of the state's congressional districts. The elections will coincide with the 2024 U.S. presidential election, as well as other elections to the House of Representatives, elections to the United States Senate, and various state and local elections.

District 2

The 2nd district encompasses southern New Jersey, containing all of Atlantic, Cape May, Cumberland, and Salem counties, and parts of Gloucester and Ocean counties. The incumbent is Republican Jeff Van Drew, who was re-elected with 58.9% of the vote in 2022.

Republican primary

Candidates

Potential
Jeff Van Drew, incumbent U.S. Representative

Democratic primary

Candidates

Declared
Carolyn Rush, engineer and candidate for this district in 2022

General election

Predictions

District 5

The incumbent is Democrat Josh Gottheimer, who was re-elected with 54.7% of the vote in 2022.

Democratic primary

Candidates

Potential
Josh Gottheimer, incumbent U.S. Representative

Republican primary

Candidates

Potential
Mehmet Oz, cardiologist, former host of The Dr. Oz Show, and nominee for U.S. Senate in Pennsylvania in 2022

General election

Predictions

District 7

The incumbent is Republican Thomas Kean Jr., who flipped the district and was elected with 51.4% of the vote in 2022.

Republican primary

Candidates

Potential
Thomas Kean Jr., incumbent U.S. Representative

Democratic primary

Candidates

Publicly expressed interest
Raymond Lesniak, former state senator from the 20th district (1983–2018) and candidate for Governor of New Jersey in 2017
Tom Malinowski, former U.S. Representative

Potential
Sue Altman, executive director of the New Jersey Working Families Party
Roy Freiman, state assemblyman from the 16th district (2018–present)
Joe Kelley, deputy chief of staff to governor Phil Murphy
Michael Makarski, advisor to the International Union of Operating Engineers and former member of the Secaucus Board of Education

Declined
Jim Johnson, former U.S. Under Secretary of the Treasury and candidate for Governor of New Jersey in 2017
Matt Klapper, chief of staff to U.S. Attorney General Merrick Garland and former chief of staff to U.S. Senator Cory Booker

General election

Predictions

District 9

The incumbent is Democrat Bill Pascrell, who was re-elected with 55.0% of the vote in 2022.

Democratic primary

Candidates

Declared
Bill Pascrell, incumbent U.S. Representative

Republican primary

Candidates

Declared
Vince Micco, commercial lending executive, former executive director of the Bergen County Republican Party, and nominee for this district in 2006 and 2008
Billy Prempeh, sales consultant, U.S. Air Force veteran, and nominee for this district in 2020 and 2022

General election

Predictions

District 12

The incumbent is Democrat Bonnie Watson Coleman, who was re-elected with 63.1% of the vote in 2022.

Democratic primary

Candidates

Potential
Bonnie Watson Coleman, incumbent U.S. Representative

Republican primary

Candidates

Declared
Darius Mayfield, talent manager and nominee for this district in 2022

General election

Predictions

References

2024
New Jersey
United States House of Representatives